The 2001 Central Michigan Chippewas football team was an American football team that represented Central Michigan University in the Mid-American Conference (MAC) during the 2001 NCAA Division I-A football season. In their second season under head coach Mike DeBord, the Chippewas compiled a 3–8 record (2–6 against MAC opponents), finished in fifth place in the MAC's West Division, and were outscored by their opponents, 346 to 251. The team played its home games in Kelly/Shorts Stadium in Mount Pleasant, Michigan, with attendance of 89,303 in five home games.

The team's statistical leaders included Derrick Vickers with 1,156 passing yards, Terrence Jackson with 1,194 rushing yards, and Rob Turner with 668 receiving yards. Halfback Terrence Jackson was also selected at the end of the 2001 season as the team's most valuable player. Cornerback Tedaro France was selected as a first-team All-MAC player.

Schedule

References

Central Michigan
Central Michigan Chippewas football seasons
Central Michigan Chippewas football